The LeRoy E. Doggett Prize is Awarded biennially by the Historical Astronomy Division of the American Astronomical Society for individuals who have significantly influenced the field of the history of astronomy by a career-long effort. The prize is a memorial to LeRoy Doggett, who was an active and highly regarded member of the Division and was serving as Secretary-Treasurer at the time of his untimely death.

See also

 List of astronomy awards

References

Astronomy prizes
American science and technology awards